Nathan Sanford (November 5, 1777 – October 17, 1838) was an American politician.

Early life 
Sanford was born on November 5, 1777, in Bridgehampton, New York.  He was the son of Thomas Sanford and Phebe (née Baker) Sanford, a family of farmers and tradesmen.

He attended Yale University, studied law, was admitted to the bar, and commenced practice in New York City.

Career
In 1803, he was appointed as United States Attorney for the District of New York, and remained in office until 1815 when the district was split into the Northern and the Southern District of New York.

He was a member of the New York State Assembly in 1808-09 and 1811. In 1811, he was elected Speaker on January 29, but could not attend the session after February 10 because of ill health. The Assembly moved to elect a new Speaker and proceeded to the election of William Ross. He was a member of the New York State Senate (Southern D.) from 1812 to 1815, sitting in the 35th, 36th, 37th and 38th New York State Legislatures.

In 1815, he was elected as a Democratic-Republican to the United States Senate and served from March 4, 1815, to March 3, 1821. He was Chairman of the Committee on Commerce and Manufactures (15th and 16th United States Congresses), and a member of the Committee on Naval Affairs (15th Congress) and the Committee on Finance (16th Congress). In 1821, he ran for re-election as a Clintonian, but was defeated by Bucktail Martin Van Buren.

He was a delegate to the New York State Constitutional Convention of 1821, and was Chancellor of New York from 1823 to 1826. In 1824, he received 30 electoral votes for U.S. Vice President.

In 1826, he resigned the chancellorship after his nomination in caucus, and was elected again to the U.S. Senate. He took his seat on January 31, 1826, and served until March 3, 1831. He was Chairman of the Committee on Foreign Relations (19th United States Congress). In this stint in the Senate, he generally aligned himself with President John Quincy Adams and Secretary of State Henry Clay. Afterwards he resumed the practice of law in Flushing, New York.

Personal life
Sanford was married three times. His first marriage was to Elizabeth "Eliza" Van Horn (1780–1811).  His residence in Flushing, "Sanford Hall", became a private insane asylum in 1845, run by Dr. James Macdonald, MD and Gen. Allan Macdonald.  Together, Nathan and Eliza were the parents of several children, including:

 Edward Sanford (1805–1876), a New York State Senator.
 Eliza Sanford, who married John Le Breton.
 Charles Sanford.
 Henry Sanford.

After his first wife's death in 1811, Sanford was remarried to Mary Esther Malbone Isaacs (1790–1816), the eldest daughter of Col. Ralph Isaacs and Elizabeth (née Sebor) Isaacs, in 1813.  Together, they were the parents of two children:

 Mary Sanford (1814–1841), who married Peter Gansevoort (1788–1876), also a New York State Senator.
 Henry Sanford (1816–1832), who died young.

After his second wife's death, he remarried for a third time to Mary Buchanan (1800–1879), whom he married in May 1828. Together, they were the parents of:

 Robert Sanford (1831–1908), a Union College and New York Law School graduate.

He died in Flushing on October 17, 1838, and was buried at St. George's Episcopal Church Cemetery in Flushing.

References

External links
 
 

|-

|-

|-

|-

|-

|-

|-

|-

|-

|-

1777 births
1838 deaths
People from Bridgehampton, New York
American people of English descent
Democratic-Republican Party United States senators from New York (state)
National Republican Party United States senators from New York (state)
New York (state) Democratic-Republicans
New York (state) National Republicans
Chairmen of the Senate Committee on Foreign Relations
1824 United States vice-presidential candidates
Speakers of the New York State Assembly
New York (state) state senators
Chancellors of New York (state)
People from Flushing, Queens
United States Attorneys for the District of New York
Yale University alumni